Meres may refer to:

 Mere (lake), a type of body of water, often one that is broad in relation to its depth.
 Mere (weapon), a Māori war club
 Meres, Iran, a village in Mazandaran Province, Iran
 Meres Valley, Meres Cliff and Meres Ledges, locales in Mullion, Cornwall, UK
 Mères of France, talented female cooks in the 18th, 19th, and 20th centuries
 Francis Meres (1565–1647), English churchman and author

See also
 Mere (disambiguation)